Louis Nicolas de Clerville, a.k.a. Chevalier de Clerville, held many military positions during his life in France in 1610–1677. He was associated with Pierre-Paul Riquet and the building of the Canal du Midi.

Clerville played an important role in François de Vendôme, Duc de Beaufort's 1664 expedition against Algiers and attempt to establish a French stronghold at Djidjelli (or Gigeri, present-day Jijel).

During his association with the canal, Clerville worked for Jean-Baptiste Colbert, minister of finance under King Louis XIV of France. He served as Colbert's commissaire general des fortifications building ports, dry docks and fortresses. Clerville verified Riquet's proposal for the canal and was Colbert's eyes and ears keeping track of Riquet's efforts.

Clerville originated the ideas for the building a single large dam of the Laudot valley near Saint-Ferréol (a hamlet of Revel). When this was accomplished, it became the Bassin de St. Ferréol. He also had the idea for digging the tunnel through the Cammazes ridge to connect the rigole de la montagne to the Bassin de St. Ferréol.

Clerville lost his standing with King Louis in 1673  and died in 1677.

References

External links
Planet TP article on Clerville
Nicolas Janburg's article on Clerville
French Struturae article on Canal du Midi showing Clerville's name

Canal du Midi
French military engineers
1610 births
1677 deaths